White Lake is a city in western Aurora County, South Dakota, United States. The population was 394 at the 2020 census.

Geography
White Lake is located at  (43.729076, -98.713294).

Climate

Demographics

2010 census
As of the census of 2010, there were 372 people, 161 households, and 88 families residing in the city. The racial makeup of the city was 94.9% White, 1.1% African American, 0.3% Native American, 2.7% Asian, and 1.1% from two or more races. Hispanic or Latino of any race were 1.6% of the population. Since then there have been Hispanic families that have moved to White Lake, such as the Avila and Orozco/Gusan family.

There were 161 households, of which 22.4% had children under the age of 18 living with them, 44.7% were married couples living together, 5.0% had a female householder with no husband present, 5.0% had a male householder with no wife present, and 45.3% were non-families. 41.0% of all households were made up of individuals, and 23.6% had someone living alone who was 65 years of age or older. The average household size was 2.09 and the average family size was 2.83.

The median age in the city was 50.5 years. 21.5% of residents were under the age of 18; 5.6% were between the ages of 18 and 24; 15% were from 25 to 44; 28% were from 45 to 64; and 29.8% were 65 years of age or older. The gender makeup of the city was 47.0% male and 53.0% female.

2000 census
As of the census of 2000, there were 405 people, 151 households, and 96 families residing in the city. The population density was 1,014.7 people per square mile (390.9/km2). There were 166 housing units at an average density of 415.9 per square mile (160.2/km2). The racial makeup of the city was 98.27% White, 1.48% Native American, and 0.25% from two or more races.

There were 151 households, out of which 25.2% had children under the age of 18 living with them, 53.0% were married couples living together, 7.9% had a female householder with no husband present, and 36.4% were non-families. 34.4% of all households were made up of individuals, and 20.5% had someone living alone who was 65 years of age or older. The average household size was 2.27 and the average family size was 2.96.

In the city, the population was spread out, with 21.5% under the age of 18, 5.7% from 18 to 24, 16.8% from 25 to 44, 19.5% from 45 to 64, and 36.5% who were 65 years of age or older. The median age was 49 years. For every 100 females, there were 77.6 males. For every 100 females age 18 and over, there were 71.9 males.

The median income for a household in the city was $25,500, and the median income for a family was $38,611. Males had a median income of $26,500 versus $20,795 for females. The per capita income for the city was $13,034. About 9.0% of families and 19.0% of the population were below the poverty line, including 24.7% of those under age 18 and 14.8% of those age 65 or over.

Education
White Lake Public Schools belong to White Lake School District (South Dakota). The three schools in the district include White Lake Elementary School, White Lake Junior High and White Lake High School, all three of which are located in one building. The school provides the basic classes: Math, Science, English/Literature, Social Studies, Band, Vocal, Computer, Psychology, Accounting, and Physical Education.

Robert Schroeder is the Superintendent of Schools.

See also
 List of cities in South Dakota

References

External links

 

Cities in Aurora County, South Dakota
Cities in South Dakota